Arnold Creek may refer to:

Streams
Arnold Creek (Georgia), a tributary of the Little River (Withlacoochee River)
Arnold Creek (Huntington Creek tributary), a tributary of Huntington Creek in Luzerne County, Pennsylvania
Arnold Creek (Indiana), a tributary of the Ohio River
Arnold Creek (Texas), a tributary of Indian Creek in the East Fork Trinity River watershed
Arnold Creek (West Virginia), a tributary of Middle Island Creek

Others
Arnold Creek, Portland, Oregon, a neighborhood